Somerset Airport  is a public-use airport in Somerset County, New Jersey, United States. It is located three miles (5 km) north of the central business district of Somerville and is privately owned by Somerset Air Service, Inc. The airport is also known as George Walker Field.

Although most U.S. airports use the same three-letter location identifier for the FAA and IATA, Somerset Airport is assigned SMQ by the FAA but has no designation from the IATA (which assigned SMQ to Sampit Airport in Indonesia).

Facilities and aircraft 
 Runway 12/30: 2,739 x 65 ft (835 x 20 m), surface: asphalt
 Runway 8/26: 1,923 x 100 ft (586 x 30 m), surface: turf
 Runway 17/35: 1,700 x 150 ft (518 x 46 m), surface: turf

For the 12-month period ending September 5, 2008, the airport had 30,339 aircraft operations, an average of 83 per day, all of which were general aviation. As of 8 January 2015, there were 121 aircraft based at this airport: 93% single-engine, and 7% multi-engine airplanes.

2017 Presidential temporary flight restrictions 
Somerset Airport is within a 10-mile radius of the Trump National Golf Club in Bedminster, New Jersey, and thereby subject to FAA flight restrictions whenever President Donald Trump is in Bedminster. Thus, the airport was shut down from August 4–20, 2017 while Trump resided in Bedminster.

References

External links 

Airports in New Jersey
Transportation buildings and structures in Somerset County, New Jersey